Ctenactis echinata is a free-living species of solitary disc coral in the family Fungiidae. It is native to the Indo-Pacific region. This is a common species throughout its wide range and the International Union for Conservation of Nature has rated its conservation status as being of "least concern".

Description
It has an axial furrow extending along most of its length with usually a single mouth opening, but occasionally there may be more than one. The primary septa are thick and heavily toothed with large triangular teeth. In between them are one to five secondary septa, smaller and lightly toothed. A large individual may have more than a thousand septa. The costae, on the underside of the coral, are poorly defined and have long arborescent or cylindrical spines arranged in radial rows. The colour of this coral is usually pale brown.

Distribution and habitat
Ctenactis echinata is native to the Indo-Pacific region. Its range extends from the Red Sea and Indian Ocean to China, Japan, Indonesia and northern Australia, as well as various island groups in the western and central Pacific Ocean.

References

Fungiidae
Cnidarians of the Indian Ocean
Cnidarians of the Pacific Ocean
Fauna of the Red Sea
Marine fauna of Asia
Marine fauna of Oceania
Marine fauna of Southeast Asia
Marine fauna of Western Asia
Anthozoa of Australia
Cnidarians of Hawaii
Taxa named by Peter Simon Pallas
Corals described in 1766